Office of Civilian Defense was a United States federal emergency war agency set up May 20, 1941, by  to co-ordinate state and federal measures for protection of civilians in case of war emergency. Its two branches supervised protective functions such as blackouts and special fire protection and "war service" functions such as child care, health, housing, and transportation. It also created the Civil Air Patrol. The agency was terminated by Executive Order 9562 of June 4, 1945. The Office of Civil Defense with similar duties was established later.

Fiorello La Guardia was the first head of the office, succeeded in 1942 by James M. Landis, followed in 1944 by General William N. Haskell.  While the agency only had a paid staff of 75, it supervised and coordinated the efforts of civilian volunteers estimated to have topped 11 million. Volunteer tasks included firefighting and air-raid preparedness. Children, under adult supervision, could volunteer in the Junior Citizens Service Corps, and were especially helpful in wartime scrap drives.

See also
 Gilbert A. Harrison, chairman of the Youth Division
 Lorenzo D. Gasser, U.S. Army major general, War Department liaison to OCD, later assistant director in charge of civilian protection.
 United States civil defense

References

External links
 
 
 
 
 

1945 disestablishments in the United States
Civilian Defense
Politics of World War II
Agencies of the United States government during World War II
Government agencies established in 1941